The Greenhorn Mountains are a small mountain range in Grant and Baker counties in the U.S. state of Oregon. They are part of the Blue Mountains.

See also
Greenhorn, Oregon

References 

Mountain ranges of Oregon
Mountain ranges of Baker County, Oregon
Mountain ranges of Grant County, Oregon